Airblaster is a clothing company based in the United States that makes clothing and accessories for snowboarding and other winter sports. It is independently owned.

Airblaster has been creating different types of mountain apparel for over 15 years. Airblaster has created unusual outerwear, goggles, and long underwear within snowboarding.

Personnel
Jesse Grandoski – owner/founder
Paul Miller – owner/founder
Travis Parker – owner/founder
Tyler Scharpf - owner

2017/ 2018 Airblaster team riders

Leanne Pelosi
Tim Eddy
Alek Østreng
Max Warbington
Erik Leon
Len Jørgensen
Temple Cummins
Madison Blackley
Freddy Perry
Tucker Andrews
Hannah Eddy
Taylor Carlton
Jackson Fowler
Max Tokunaga
Yusaku Horii
Nick Dirks
Travis Parker

References

External links
Official website

Clothing companies of the United States
Manufacturing companies based in Portland, Oregon
Clothing companies established in 2002
Retail companies established in 2002
Privately held companies based in Oregon
2002 establishments in Oregon